Callatis Mangalia was a Romanian professional football club from Mangalia, Constanța County, founded in 1962 and dissolved in 2015.

History
The club was founded in 1962 under the name of Metalul Mangalia and until 1990 was financially sustained by the Mangalia Military Shipyard.

Callatis promoted to the Liga II at the end of the 2010–11 season, after winning the Seria II of the Liga III. It managed to finish higher than its main rival Unirea Slobozia. It returned to the Liga II after an absence of 5 years, last playing there in the 2005–06 season.

Just 4 days before the start of the 2012–13 Liga II it withdrew from the championship because of financial difficulties.

It was registered for the 2012–13 season in the Liga IV and promoted at the end of it to the Liga III.

In the summer of 2015 the team withdrew from Liga III because of the financial problems.

Honours
Liga III
Winners (5): 1983–84, 1987–88, 1989–90, 1998–99, 2010–11
Runners-up (1): 2001–02

Liga IV – Constanța County
Winners (3): 1968–69, 1979–80, 2012–13

Notable Managers

  Mihai Stoichiță
  Ion Dumitru
  Imilian Șerbănică
  Constantin Bârbora

References

External links
 Official website

Mangalia
Association football clubs established in 1962
Association football clubs disestablished in 2015
Defunct football clubs in Romania
Football clubs in Constanța County
Liga II clubs
Liga III clubs
Liga IV clubs
1962 establishments in Romania
2015 disestablishments in Romania